Hanif-ur-Rehman (born 31 March 1976) is a Pakistani first-class cricketer who played for Hyderabad cricket team.

References

External links
 

1976 births
Living people
Pakistani cricketers
Hyderabad (Pakistan) cricketers
People from Naushahro Feroze District